Diary of a Sergeant is a 1945 American short propaganda film produced by the US government. It starred Harold Russell and focused on the loss of his hands in an accident.

The film was seen by William Wyler who cast Russell in The Best Years of Our Lives (1946).

References

External links 

Complete film at US National Archives

1945 films
1940s war films
1945 short films
American short films
American World War II propaganda shorts
American black-and-white films
American war films
Films directed by Joseph M. Newman
1940s English-language films
1940s American films